Universal Studios Dubailand was a proposed Universal Studios theme park in Dubai, United Arab Emirates. Originally planned to be built within Dubailand, a future entertainment mega-complex, the project broke ground in July 2008 but stalled a short time later. On October 27, 2016, officials announced the permanent cancellation of the project.

Development
Universal Studios Dubailand was a joint venture costing over 8 billion dirhams ($2.2 billion US) between Universal Studios and Tatweer, a subsidiary of Dubai Holdings.  The theme park was announced on April 30, 2007 with a theme park plan that expected to attract 5 million visitors annually and was scheduled to be completed in 2010.

The project broke ground July 27, 2008, but the global financial crisis at the time prompted the developers to announce that they would delay further development, and push back the opening until at least the first quarter of 2012. However, no construction work on the project site has been reported since at least early 2009. By mid-2012, the only public evidence of the project is a gate bearing the Universal Studios logo.

The identity of the Dubai joint venture partner is no longer clear, as Tatweer was dissolved in mid-2010, with most of its assets merged into TECOM or other members of Dubai Holdings. In April 2011, Universal was once again in talks with Dubai officials about finishing the Universal park. By late 2012, there had still not been any construction progress on the proposed site. In late November 2012, Dubai's ruler, Mohammed bin Rashid Al Maktoum, announced Dubai's renewed intentions to invest in an array of development projects in the desert just outside central Dubai, including the world's largest mall and an attached Universal Studios branded "family entertainment centre."

On October 27, 2016, it was announced that plans for the Universal Studios Dubailand theme park had officially been scrapped.

Themed areas

Hollywood
The area was to be designed a lot like Universal Studios Florida's Hollywood area. It was expected to feature a Mel’s Diner building as seen at Universal's Florida, Japan, and Singapore parks. Restaurant chain Planet Hollywood was thought to be planning on opening their largest restaurant in the area.

New York
A heavily themed area featuring a Blues Brothers outdoor show and a Hooray for Bollywood indoor show. The area was also expected to feature an air-conditioned undercover Gramercy Park Square. There was also going to be both a trackless dark-ride shooter themed to Ghostbusters and a Men In Black rollercoaster, which would have been a clone of The Incredible Hulk Coaster at Universal's Islands Of Adventure.

Surf City
A boardwalk/beach themed area for kids was expected to feature Woody Woodpecker’s Nuthouse Coaster, a sand castle themed carousel and Frantic Freeway. It was also expected to have three attractions based on Sesame Street (anchored by Sesame Street 4-D Movie Magic), as Sesame Workshop signed an agreement in February 2009.

Epic Adventures
Epic Adventures would have been the home to Jurassic Park Rapids Adventure, Waterworld and a new King Kong dueling roller coaster which would have been a clone of Dueling Dragons from Universal's Island Of Adventure.

Legendary Heroes
Legendary Heroes was expected to be the home of another incarnation of the Revenge of the Mummy indoor roller coaster. It was also set to be the home to the Eighth Voyage of Sinbad, a foam ball play area and King Tot's Oasis (a water play area).

References

External links
 Official web of Universal Studios Dubailand (defunct)

Cancelled projects
 
Unfinished buildings and structures